The Marine Corps Legacy Museum was located on the northwest corner of the Town Square in Harrison, Arkansas, United States. It closed in 2010.

Information
The museum contained exhibits and artifacts relating to the heritage and history of the U. S. Marine Corps. In 2003, the museum won the prestigious Colonel John H. Magruder III Award from the Marine Corps Heritage Foundation.

See also
Marine Corps Museums
United States Marine Corps

Notes

External links
Marine Corps Legacy Museum (official website)
Marines (official website of the U. S. Marines)

Marine Corps museums in the United States
Military and war museums in Arkansas
Museums in Boone County, Arkansas
Defunct museums in Arkansas
2010 disestablishments in Arkansas
Buildings and structures in Harrison, Arkansas
2001 establishments in Arkansas